So Ends My Song (German:Das Ende vom Liede) is a 1919 German silent film directed by Willy Grunwald and starring Asta Nielsen.

Cast
 Asta Nielsen as Dora Waren  
 Marga Köhler as Agathe von Waren  
 Julius Geisendörfer as Kurt von Reppen 
 Joseph Römer as Dr. Torsten  
 Fritz Wrede as Bankier Holst  
 Olga Wojan as Luise Kern 
 Robert Hartmann as Diener Franz 
 Max Zilzer

References

Bibliography
 Hans-Michael Bock and Tim Bergfelder. The Concise Cinegraph: An Encyclopedia of German Cinema. Berghahn Books.

External links

1919 films
Films of the Weimar Republic
German silent feature films
German black-and-white films
1910s German films